The 1887 Yale Bulldogs football team was an American football team that represented Yale University as a member of the Intercollegiate Football Association (IFA) during the 1887 college football season. The team compiled a perfect 9–0 record, shut out seven of nine opponents, and outscored all opponents by a total of 515 to 12. Quarterback Harry Beecher was the team's captain.

There was no contemporaneous system in 1887 for determining a national champion. However, Yale was retroactively named as the national champion by the Billingsley Report, Helms Athletic Foundation, Houlgate System, National Championship Foundation, and Parke H. Davis.

Schedule

References

Yale
Yale Bulldogs football seasons
College football national champions
College football undefeated seasons
Yale Bulldogs football